Casco Bay is an inlet of the Gulf of Maine on the southern coast of Maine, New England, United States. Its easternmost approach is Cape Small and its westernmost approach is Two Lights in Cape Elizabeth. The city of Portland sits along its southern edge and the Port of Portland lies within.

European discovery 
There are two theories on the origin of the name "Casco Bay".  Aucocisco is the Abenaki name for the bay, which means 'place of herons' (sometimes translated as 'muddy'). The Portuguese explorer Estêvão Gomes, mapped the Maine coast in 1525 and named the bay "Bahía de Cascos" (Bay of Helmets, based on the shape of the bay).

The first colonial settlement in Casco Bay was that of Capt. Christopher Levett, an English explorer, who built a house on House Island in 1623–24. The settlement failed.  The first permanent settlement of the bay was named Casco; despite changing names throughout history, that settlement remains the largest city in the Casco Bay region, now called the city of Portland, Maine.

It was first reported in 1700 by Colonel Wolfgang William Römer, an English military engineer, that the bay had "as many islands as there are days in the year", leading to the bay's islands being called the Calendar Islands based on the popular myth there are 365 of them. The United States Coastal Pilot lists 136 islands; meanwhile, Robert M. York, the former Maine state historian, said there are "little more than two hundred islands".

History

Native American occupation and relations 
At the time of European contact in the sixteenth century, people speaking an Eastern dialect of the Wabanaki language inhabited present-day Casco Bay.

A number of Treaties were negotiated and signed between the British colonies and members of the Wabanaki Confederacy in Casco Bay, including the Treaty of Casco (1678), the Treaty of Casco (1703), and Treaty of Casco Bay (1727).

The latter Treaty was the result of a Conference between the British and the Abenaki in August, 1727, at which the parties agreed to uphold the terms of the 1725 Treaty of Peace and Friendship which ended Dummer's War, and to cooperate with each other in keeping the peace. Chief Loron Sagouarram, who had signed the Treaty of 1725, addressed the gathering in 1727, providing his understanding of the Treaty relationship.

During King William's War, Louis de Buade de Frontenac, the Governor General of New France, launched a campaign to drive the English from the settlements east of Falmouth, Maine. On 16 May, 1690, the fortified settlement on Casco Bay was attacked by a war party of 50 French-Canadian soldiers led by Jean-Vincent d'Abbadie de Saint-Castin, about 50 Abenaki warriors from Canada, a contingent of French militia led by Joseph-François Hertel de la Fresnière, and 300-400 additional natives from Maine, including some Penobscots under the leadership of Madockawando. Fort Loyal was attacked at the same time. About 75 men in the Casco settlement fought for four days before surrendering on 20 May, on condition of safe passage. Instead, most of the men, including John Swarton, were killed, and the surviving settlers were taken captive, including Hannah Swarton and her children. Swarton was ransomed in 1695 and her story published by Cotton Mather.

War of 1812
Casco Bay is also home to abandoned military fortifications dating from the War of 1812 through World War II; during World War II, Casco Bay served as an anchorage for US Navy ships.

Civil War 
Fort Gorges on Hog Island Ledge in the middle of Portland Harbor, dates to the American Civil War.

World War II
Since Casco Bay was the nearest American anchorage to the Atlantic Lend-Lease convoy routes to Britain prior to US entry into World War II, Admiral King ordered a large pool of destroyers to be stationed there for convoy escort duty in August 1941.

The State Historic Site of Eagle Island was the summer home of Arctic explorer Robert Peary.

In popular culture 
The Whales of August, one of Bette Davis's last films, was shot here in 1987.
In 2008, composers Peter J. McLaughlin and Akiva G. Zamcheck wrote a piece in four movements paying homage to the wreck of the Don, lost near Ragged Island on June 29, 1941. The piece received critical acclaim from the Portland Press Herald and from fellow Maine composers.

Marine economy 
Portland has a substantial fleet of deep-sea fishing vessels that offload their catch primarily at the Portland Fish Exchange. Numerous towns and islands serve as ports for lobster boats. Recreational fishing boats can also be chartered.

Marinas include:
 Chebeague Island Boat Yard on Great Chebeague Island;
 Diamond Marine Service Inc. on Great Diamond Island;
 Dolphin Marina and Great Island Boat Yard in Harpswell;
 Handy Boat Service Inc. in Falmouth;
 DiMillo's Old Port Marina, Maine Yacht Center and Portland Yacht Services in Portland;
 Paul's Marina on Mere Point in Brunswick;
 Peaks Island Marina on Peaks Island;
 Port Harbor Marina, South Port Marine, Spring Point Marina and Sunset Marina in South Portland;
 Brewer's and Strouts Point Wharf Co. in South Freeport;
 Royal River Boat Yard, Yankee Marina and Boatyard, and Yarmouth Boat Yard in Yarmouth Harbor.

During the 1980s and 1990s, Bath Iron Works operated a dry dock in Portland Harbor to repair U.S. Navy vessels.

Ecology 
Predominant fish in the bay include mackerel, striped bass, and bluefish. Shellfish include lobsters, crabs, mussels, clams and snails.
Harbor seals congregate on certain exposed ledges, and whales on occasion swim into the bay, and in a few instances into Portland Harbor.
Seagulls, cormorants and varying species of ducks are the most common birds; more rarely osprey, eagles and herons have been sighted.
Casco Bay contains bay mud bottoms and banks in some locations, providing important substrates for biota.

Transportation 

The major islands in the bay are served by the Casco Bay Lines ferry service at the Maine State Pier in Portland. Peaks Island is served by a car ferry and, during the summer, sees 16 ferries a day. The other islands see fewer ferries and no car transport. Great and Little Diamond islands and Long Island are served primarily by the Diamond Pass run, which is popular with tourists in the summer months. Other services offered by Casco Bay Lines include a daily mailboat run, a cruise to Bailey Island, and a sunset run.

Other services such as water taxis are also popular alternatives to the ferry, but are limited to six passengers per boat.

Notable cities and towns
From south to north:
 Cape Elizabeth
 South Portland
 Portland
 Falmouth
 Cumberland
 Yarmouth
 Freeport
 Brunswick
 Harpswell
 West Bath
 Phippsburg

Islands 

Major islands

 Bailey Island
 Bustins Island
 Cliff Island
 Cousins Island
 Cushing Island
 Great Diamond Island
 Great Chebeague Island
 Long Island
 Mackworth Island
 Orr's Island
 Peaks Island
 Sebascodegan Island (Great Island)

Minor islands

 Bangs Island
 Basket Island
 Barnes Island
 Bartol Island
 Basin Island
 Bates Island
 Bear Island
 Ben Island
 Big Hen Island
 Birch Island
 Bombazine Island
 Bowman Island
 Bragdon Island
 Burnt Coat Island
 Bush Island
 Center Island
 Clapboard Island
 Coombs Islands
 Cow Island
 Crab Island
 Crow Island
 Dingley Island
 Eagle Island
 East Brown Cow Island
 Elm Islands
 French Island
 George Island
 Gooseberry Island
 Goose Nest Island
 Great Mark Island
 Halfway Rock
 Harbor Island
 Haskell Island
 Hope Island
 Horse Island
 Home Island
 House Island
 Inner Green Island
 Irony Island
 Jacquish Island
 Jenny Island
 Jewel Island
 Junk of Pork
 Lanes Island
 Little Bustins Island
 Little Chebeague Island
 Little Birch Island
 Little Diamond Island
 Little French Island
 Littlejohn Island
 Little Mark Island
 Little Moshier Island
 Little Snow Island
 Little Whaleboat Island
 Little Wood Island
 Lower Goose Island
 Malaga Island
 Mark Island
 Ministerial Island
 Moshier Island
 Mouse Island
 Outer Green Island
 Overset Island
 Pettingill Island
 Pinkham Island
 Pole Island
 Pound of Tea
 Pumpkin Nob
 Ragged Island
 Ram Island
 Raspberry Island
 Rogue Island
 Sand Island
 Scrag Island
 Sheep Island
 Shelter Island
 Snow Island
 Stave Island (home to Survivor: Gabon winner Bob Crowley)
 Stockman Island
 Sister Island
 Sow and Pigs
 Sturdivant Island
 Turnip Island
 Two Bush Island
 Upper Flag Island
 Upper Goose Island
 Upper Green Island
 The Brothers
 The Goslings
 The Nubbin
 Vail Island
 Whaleboat Island
 White Island
 White Bull Island
 Williams Island
 Wood Island
 Yarmouth Island

Lighthouses

Casco Bay is home to 6 lighthouses:
 Cape Elizabeth Lights
 Portland Head Light
 Ram Island Ledge Light
 Spring Point Ledge Light
 Portland Breakwater (Bug) Light
 Halfway Rock Light

Forts
Forts in Casco Bay:

Newspapers

The newspaper for Portland, the largest city in Casco Bay, is the Portland Press Herald (Maine Sunday Telegram on Sundays).  The Island Institute publishes The Working Waterfront, a free monthly newspaper reporting "the news of Maine's coast and islands." For Southern Maine news, obituaries and sports, The Forecaster is published weekly. In the early twentieth-century, the Casco Bay Breeze published news of the islands from 1901 to 1917.  Digitized copies of The Casco Bay Breeze from 1903 to 1917 appear for free on the Library of Congress' website Chronicling America.

See also
 List of islands of Maine
 Casco, Wisconsin, named after Casco Bay

References
 
 Bibliography of Casco Bay

External links

 
Bays of Maine
Bodies of water of Cumberland County, Maine